Bathymyrus simus is an eel in the family Congridae (conger/garden eels). It was described by J.L.B. Smith in 1965. It is a tropical, marine eel which inhabits moderately deep water. It is known from the Penghu Islands and Vietnam, in the western Pacific Ocean. Males can reach a maximum total length of 19.5 centimetres.

References

Congridae
Fish described in 1965